El Pisito is a 1959 Spanish comedy film directed by Marco Ferreri. The Spanish Ministry of Culture forced the producers to sign the film as co-directed by Spaniard Isidoro M. Ferry. It was co-written by famous Spanish screenwriter Rafael Azcona, who collaborated with Ferreri throughout his career.

The film was a huge flop when it was released in Spain, but nowadays is a cult classic. The film had troubles with Spanish censorship.

In the film, Marco Ferreri and Carlos Saura appear in cameos.

Plot 
In the Madrid of the late fifties, with a Spain that is barely beginning to emerge from underdevelopment, economic hardship is common among the population. Petrita (Mary Carrillo) and Rodolfo (José Luis López Vázquez) have been dating for twelve years, but they cannot get married due to lack of means to acquire a home. Petrita finally glimpses a solution: Rodolfo will marry Doña Martina, her old and sick landlady, so that when she dies she will inherit the lease on the property at a low price. After the ceremony, however, the old woman will still be able to survive two years. She finally dies, and Petrita and Rodolfo see their goal fulfilled, although pessimism and sadness reign in the environment.

References

External links
 

1959 films
Spanish black comedy films
Spanish black-and-white films
Films directed by Marco Ferreri
Madrid in fiction
Social realism in film
Spain in fiction
1950s Spanish-language films
1950s black comedy films
Films based on Spanish novels
Films with screenplays by Rafael Azcona
1959 comedy films
1959 drama films
1950s Spanish films